Daddy Dewdrop is a pseudonym for American songwriter Richard "Dick" Monda (born 1940, Cleveland, Ohio, United States). He is best known for his 1971 hit "Chick-A-Boom (Don't Ya Jes' Love It)".

Biography
Monda's family re-located from Ohio to California in the mid–1940s. He and his sister performed in vaudeville and shows around Hollywood. As a child, Monda appeared in the films The Glass Wall and Go for Broke! At 13, he was chosen to play Eddie Cantor as a boy in the film The Eddie Cantor Story, in which he performed six songs, including dance routines. At 16, he had a featured role in The Midnight Story.

He began songwriting as a young man and received a degree in mathematics.

His first production with Moonglow Records was "Don't Do it Some More", by The Cindermen, credited under the pen name Daddy Dewdrop. After Moonglow, he signed with Four Star Music publishing co. where he stayed for seven years. He made most of his recordings during this period. He was signed to Verve Records as an artist and recorded his first album, Truth, Lies, Magic and Faith.

Two years later after producing music for the Saturday morning cartoon series Groovie Goolies, he released the song "Chick-A-Boom", originally written for the show. Monda put together a backup band of studio musicians, including Tom Hensley, who later became the musical director for Neil Diamond, and Butch Rillera, who later became a member of the group Redbone, and recorded a version of the song, retitled "Chick-A-Boom (Don't Ya Jes' Love It)". The tune, which was distributed by Sunflower Records, became a top 10 hit in the United States, peaking on the Billboard Pop Singles chart at #9 in 1971, and #3 on Cashbox. Other charted records include "Fox Huntin' on the Weekend" and "Chantilly Lace", and after a change of labels to "Inphasion Records", he had another chart record, "Nanu, Nanu, (I Wanna Get Funky Wich You)" and "The Real Thing".

He appeared in several underground films, including The Michael Girard directed Troma films, Oversexed Rug Suckers from Mars, Body Parts and the indie film The Artichokes.

He recorded an album called "Or Durvs" under the alias "Lu Janis".

Discography

Albums
As Dick Monda

As Daddy Dewdrop

Singles
As Dick Monda

As Daddy Dewdrop

References

External links

1940 births
Living people
Songwriters from Ohio
Musicians from Cleveland